The following highways are numbered 845:

Canada
 Alberta highway 845

United States